The BMW 2 Series Gran Coupé (model code F44) is a subcompact executive sedan produced by BMW. It was revealed on 16 October 2019, and officially premiered at the 2019 Los Angeles Auto Show in November. It was launched in worldwide markets in March 2020. For most markets, the 2 Series Gran Coupé is the smallest four-door sedan offered by BMW, except in China and Mexico where the F52 1 Series sedan is offered.

Overview 
The 2 Series uses the front-wheel drive-based UKL2 architecture and uses a multi-link rear suspension system. As the result, despite its similar name, it is mechanically unrelated to the F22 2 Series coupé and convertible. It shares the same front hood, fender panel, dashboard and suspension as the F40 1 Series.

All petrol and diesel engines are installed with particulate filters and meet the Euro 6d-TEMP emissions standard. Diesel engines also have AdBlue selective catalytic reduction.

218i models are available with a 6-speed manual transmission or a 7-speed dual-clutch transmission. 228i xDrive, M235i xDrive, and 220d models are only available with an 8-speed automatic transmission. 220i models are only available with a 7-speed dual-clutch transmission.

Equipment 
Standard equipment includes full LED lights and 40:20:40 split folding rear seats. Collision detection with braking intervention is also standard in European models. In addition to the basic model, the 2 Series is available in the Luxury and Sport line which adds 17-inch wheels and a sports steering wheel, and the M Sport line which adds 18-inch wheels, an M Sport steering wheel, and M Sport exterior styling.

Optional equipment includes ambient lighting, a panoramic sunroof, a 9.2-inch windshield reflected head up display, and Apple CarPlay. The F44 2 Series can be unlocked via near-field communication by holding a smartphone near the door handle, and can start the engine by placing the smartphone in the wireless charging tray. The digital key can also be shared with up to 5 other smartphones.

The 2 Series is also available with iDrive 7 which features over-the-air software updates and a digital assistant that can be activated by saying "Hello BMW". The digital assistant learns the habits of the user over time and can control in-car functions, check the maintenance status, or answer questions about the vehicle's functions.

The 2 Series uses the navigation system and camera data to prevent unnecessary gear changes when travelling through corners and to determine appropriate shutdowns for the engine start-stop system.

218-228 models with the M Sport Trim and M235 models can be fitted with M Performance Parts. These include sport brakes, carbon fibre mirrors and M rims.

Models

Petrol engines 

*Canada and US Market only.

Diesel engines

References

External links 

 Official website

2 Series
Cars introduced in 2019
2020s cars
Compact cars
Sedans
Front-wheel-drive vehicles
All-wheel-drive vehicles